Chinyere Yvonne Okoro is a Ghanaian Nigerian actress. Born to a Nigerian dad and Ghanaian mother, Yvonne Okoro is of mixed lineage and calls herself an African. Yvonne Okoro is from Koforidua in the Eastern Parts of Ghana. She received Ghana Movie Awards Best Actress Award in 2010 and was nominated for Africa Movie Academy Awards Best Actress twice in a row in 2011 and 2012 for her movies Pool Party and Single Six. She has also received four Africa Magic Viewers' Choice Award  and in 2012 was honoured with a Distinguished Achievement Award at the Nigeria Excellence Awards.

Early life

Born to a  Ghanaian mother and a Nigerian father. Yvonne Okoro is of mixed lineage and calls herself an African. She comes from a very large family, as the first child of her mother and the fifth of all siblings. She, from a young age, showed desire to be an actress. She attended Achimota Preparatory School after which she went to the Lincoln Community School and then to Faith Montessori School. She continued at Mfantsiman Girls Secondary School after which she enrolled at University of Ghana, Legon where she did Bachelor of Arts, combining English and Linguistics. 
Subsequently, she was at the Universite de Nantes in France to study Press Civilization, Drama and Marketing.

Career 
She made her screen debut in Sticking to the Promise, a 2002 movie produced by the Nigerian producer Theo Akatugba, just after her Senior High Education. 
She also played a cameo role in the hit series Tentacles by the same producer for Point Blank Media Concepts.

She's currently the host of Dinning with Cooks and Braggarts. Cooks and Braggarts is a celebrity cooking show that features well-known figures to mint their hands on how they cook their favorite foods while bespeaking about various topics.

Other ventures 
She made it known to Accra-based radio Peace FM that she owns her own company Desamour Company Limited. As well as other transport business.

Philanthropy 
In 2019, she donated to the Black queens of Ghana ahead of the 2019 WAFA tournament. At the start of 2020, she also donated some items to maternity ward of the Korle bu Teaching Hospital.

Filmography

Queen Lateefah
Mother's love 
Beyonce: The President's Daughter
The Return Of Beyonce
The President's Daughter
Desperate To Survive
The Game
Agony Of Christ
Royal Battle
Queen Of Dreams
‘Le Hotelier’ in France
Pool Party
Sticking to the promise
Single Six
Why Marry
Best Friends (Three can play)
Blood is Thick
Four Play
Four Play reloaded
Forbidden City
Contract (28th Dec. 2012) with Hlomlo dandala.
I Broke my Heart
Adams Apples film series (2011–2012)
Crime
Ghana Must Go (2016)
Rebecca (2016)

Like Cotton Twines (2016)

References

External links

Ghanaian film actresses
Living people
Ghanaian people of Nigerian descent
University of Ghana alumni
University of Nantes alumni
Mfantsiman Girls' Secondary School alumni
1984 births
21st-century Nigerian actresses